"Bugeilio'r Gwenith Gwyn" is an 18th-century traditional Welsh love song.

It describes the tragic love affair between Wil Hopcyn and Ann Thomas (The Maid of Cefn Ydfa) from the village of Llangynwyd in Glamorganshire. Ann belonged to a wealthy farming family but Wil was only a farm labourer. Ann's mother rejected Wil and forced Ann into a marriage with Anthony Maddocks, the son of a local squire.

A few days before the marriage took place Wil left Llangynwyd. Months later Wil had a dream in which Ann's new husband had died, so he returned home. However, when he arrived he discovered that in fact it was Ann who was dying, from a broken heart. Ann died in his arms that day.

Maddocks inherited the Thomas' estate and soon re-married. Wil died in 1741, never having married. Both he and Ann are buried at Llangynwyd.

The song was collected from the oral tradition in the 1830s and was first published in 1844 by the Welsh musician and folklorist Maria Jane Williams in her collection Ancient National Airs of Gwent and Morganwg.

Lyrics
There are several versions of the lyrics with minor variations in the words and additional verses. A modern version is:
Mi sydd fachgen ieuanc ffôl
Yn byw yn ôl fy ffansi,
Myfi'n bugeilio'r gwenith gwyn,
Ac arall yn ei fedi.
Pam na ddeui ar fy ôl,
Ryw ddydd ar ôl ei gilydd?
Gwaith 'rwy'n dy weld, y feinir fach,
Yn lanach, lanach beunydd.

Glanach, glanach wyt bob dydd,
Neu fi yn wir sy'n ffolach;
Er mwyn y Gŵr a wnaeth dy wedd
Gwna im' drugaredd bellach.
Cwnn dy ben, gwel acw draw,
Rho im' dy law wen dirion;
Gwaith yn dy fynwes bert ei thro
Mae allwedd clo fy nghalon.

Tra fo dŵr y môr yn hallt,
A thra bo gallt yn tyfu,
A thra fo calon dan fy mron
Mi fydda'n ffyddlon iti;
Dywed imi'r gwir heb gêl,
A rho dan sêl d'atebion,
P'un ai myfi ai arall, Ann
Sydd orau gan dy galon.

Tune

First published version
The melody and words first published by Maria Jane Williams in 1844:

Modern version
A modern version of the tune is:

References

External links
 

Welsh folk songs
18th-century songs